Ania Rebecca Scheja (born 26 January 1989) is a Swedish actress, disc jockey (DJ), singer, songwriter and record producer. She is the daughter of Staffan and Marianne Scheja and sister of Leonard Scheja. As a student she attended the Adolf Fredrik's Music School in Stockholm.

Scheja is in the DJ duet Rebecca & Fiona with Fiona Fitzpatrick since she met her at a party in 2007, and they have owned the club DET at Spy Bar in Stockholm since 2008. Together with Adrian Lux, they produced the song "Boy".

Scheja and Fitzpatrick won a Grammis in 2011 and 2015.

Selected filmography
1997 – Adam & Eva
1998 – Längtans blåa blomma (TV)
1999 – En häxa i familjen
2000 – Den bästa sommaren
2005 – Sandor slash Ida
2009 – Bröllopsfotografen

Discography

Albums
2011 – I Love You, Man!
2014 – "Beauty Is Pain"

Singles
2010 – Luminary Ones (with Fiona Fitzpatrick)
2011 – Bullets
2011 – If She Was Away/Hard
2011 – Jane Doe
2012 – Dance
2013: "Taken Over" (with Style Of Eye)
2013: "Union"
2013: "Hot Shots" (with Vice)
2014: "Candy Love"
2014: "Holler"

References

External links

Rebeccafiona's website
Interview with Rebecca & Fiona on 31 August 2011 on www.cafe.se
Rebecca Scheja on Swedish Film Database

Living people
1989 births
Women DJs
Swedish DJs
21st-century Swedish actresses
English-language singers from Sweden
Swedish songwriters
Swedish women record producers
Swedish film actresses
Swedish television actresses
Swedish people of Polish-Jewish descent
Place of birth missing (living people)
Feminist musicians
Electronic dance music DJs
21st-century Swedish singers
21st-century Swedish women singers